The Wairau River is one of the longest rivers in New Zealand's South Island.

The river's lower reaches and surrounding fertile plain provide the basis for the Marlborough wine region. The river has its outflow into Cook Strait at Cloudy Bay, just north of Blenheim in the island's northeast. The Wairau River meets the sea at the Wairau Bar, an important archaeological site.

In pre-European and early colonial New Zealand, one of the South Island's largest Māori settlements was close to the mouth of the Wairau. The Wairau Valley was the scene of the 1843 Wairau Affray, the first violent clash between Maori residents and English settlers over land in New Zealand.

Hydroelectricity 
There are currently two hydroelectric power stations operating on tributaries of the river.

Up to 60 percent of the flow of the river will be diverted into the canal. A resource consent has been granted for the scheme but opponents have already appealed to the Environment Court.

References

External links
TrustPower - Wairau Valley hydroelectric power scheme (archived from original)
Marlborough Online
Te Ara Entry

Rivers of the Marlborough Region
Rivers of New Zealand